Blair Neil Joseph "B. J." MacDonald (born November 17, 1953) is a Canadian former professional ice hockey player who played in the National Hockey League and World Hockey Association between 1973 and 1983. He featured in the 1979 WHA Final with the Edmonton Oilers and the 1982 Stanley Cup Finals with the Vancouver Canucks.

He is best known for his time with the Oilers, the club where he spent the majority of his career and where he served as one of Wayne Gretzky's first linemates at the start of Gretzky's NHL career.

Playing career

WHA
After a stellar final year of junior hockey with the Cornwall Royals of the QMJHL in which he scored 63 goals in 64 games, MacDonald was selected 86th overall by the Los Angeles Kings in the 1973 NHL Amateur Draft. However, he was also selected 30th overall by the Alberta Oilers (returned to original name Edmonton Oilers a few months later) of the rival World Hockey Association in their draft, and chose to forego the NHL to sign in Edmonton.

MacDonald had a solid rookie professional season in 1973–74, finishing the year with 21 goals and 45 points in 78 games, and posted nearly identical numbers in 1974–75 with 22 goals and 46 points. After a sluggish start to the 1975–76 campaign, he was dealt to the Indianapolis Racers, where he rediscovered his scoring touch and finished the year with a career-high 26 goals. In 1976–77, he blossomed into a top player for the Racers, leading the team with 34 goals and finishing with 64 points. He then added 15 points in nine games in the playoffs.

For 1977–78, MacDonald was traded back to the Oilers, where he enjoyed another fine season with 34 goals and 68 points. Just after the start of the 1978–79 season, Edmonton traded for 17-year-old wunderkind Wayne Gretzky, who dominated the sport for the next two decades. As the Oilers' top right winger and a natural sniper, MacDonald became one of Gretzky's regular wingers, along with Brett Callighen, and finished the year with 34 goals and a career-high 71 points.

NHL
Riding the playmaking wizardry of Gretzky, he would finish the season with 46 goals and 48 assists for 94 points, a total good for 10th in the league. He also played in the 1980 NHL All-Star Game on a line with Gretzky and the Flyers' Bill Barber. With just six penalty minutes all season, he finished fourth in balloting for the Lady Byng Trophy as the league's most gentlemanly player, an award ultimately won by Gretzky. On October 14, 1979, MacDonald along with Callighen both assisted on Gretzky's first NHL goal. When team captain Ron Chipperfield was traded in early 1980, Macdonald was made the NHL Oilers' second ever captain, and fifth overall in the history of the franchise.

At the trade deadline, MacDonald was dealt to the Vancouver Canucks, where he responded well with 14 points in 12 games to finish the season with 24 goals and 57 points in 63 games between Edmonton and Vancouver.

Despite scoring fairly regularly when in the Canucks' lineup, MacDonald would have a tumultuous tenure in Vancouver where his lack of grit and defensive play failed to endear him to the coaching staff.

After being released by the Canucks, MacDonald spent three more seasons playing in Austria before retiring in 1986. He finished his career with 91 goals and 100 assists for 191 points in 219 NHL games, and added 171 goals and 165 assists for 336 points in 476 games in the WHA.

Following the conclusion of his playing career, MacDonald accepted a head coaching job in Austria, and has spent most of his time since coaching in both Europe and North America. In 1988–89, he was named the International Hockey League Coach of the Year after leading the Muskegon Lumberjacks to a 57–18–7 record and the league championship.

Career statistics

External links

Profile at hockeydraftcentral.com

1953 births
Living people
Canadian ice hockey right wingers
Canadian people of Scottish descent
Cornwall Royals (QMJHL) players
Dallas Black Hawks players
Edmonton Oilers (WHA) draft picks
Edmonton Oilers (WHA) players
Edmonton Oilers players
Fredericton Express players
Ice hockey people from Ontario
Indianapolis Racers players
Innsbrucker EV players
Los Angeles Kings draft picks
Montana Magic players
Sportspeople from Cornwall, Ontario
Vancouver Canucks players
Canadian expatriate ice hockey players in Austria